The Carolina Phoenix is a football team in the Women's Football Alliance (WFA) based in the Triad of North Carolina. Home games are played at Simeon Stadium in High Point, North Carolina.

After finishing 5–1 in their 2007 debut season as an X-Team, the Phoenix began full-time play in 2008 as a member of Tier II.  The success continued there, as the Phoenix finished 7–1, winning the Tier II South Atlantic division title before losing to the eventual Tier II champion Montreal Blitz in the semifinal round of the playoffs.

Key Players: The Sisterhood

Season-by-season 

|-
|2007 || 5 || 1 || 0 || X-Team || --
|-
|2008 || 7 || 2 || 0 || 1st IWFL2 Southern South Atlantic || Lost IWFL2 League Semifinal (Montreal)
|-
|2009 || 8 || 2 || 0 || 1st IWFL2 || Won IWFL2 League Quarterfinal (Carolina Queens)Lost IWFL2 League Semifinal (Wisconsin)
|-
|2010 || 9 || 1 || 0 || 1st IWFL2 Eastern Southeast || Won IWFL2 Eastern Conference Semifinal (Chattanooga)Lost IWFL2 Eastern Conference Championship (Montreal)
|-
|2011 || 7 || 1 || 0 || 1st Eastern Mid-Attantic || Won Eastern Conference Semifinal (Montreal)Lost Eastern Conference Championship (Atlanta)
|-
|2012 || 7 || 1 || 0 || 2nd Eastern Mid South || Won Founders Bowl Tournament Quarterfinal (Arlington)Won Founders Bowl Tournament Semifinal (New England)Won Founders Bowl Tournament Championship (Portland) 
|-
|2013 || 11 || 0 || 0 || 1st Eastern Southeast || Won Eastern Conference Semifinal (Philadelphia)Won Eastern Conference Championship (New England)Won IWFL Championship (Houston)
|-
|2014 || 4 || 5 || 0 || 1st Eastern South Atlantic || Lost Eastern Conference Semifinal (New York)
|-
|2015 || 8 || 3 || 0 || 1st Eastern South Atlantic || Won Eastern Conference Semifinal (Carolina Queens)Lost Eastern Conference Championship (Pittsburgh)Won Founders Bowl (Madison)
|-
|2016 || 9 || 1 || 0 || 2nd Eastern Atlantic || Won Founders Bowl Tournament Semifinal (Madison)Won Founders Bowl Tournament Championship (Carson)
|-
!Totals || 75 || 17 || 0
|colspan="2"| (including playoffs)

Season schedule

2009

2010

References

External links
 Carolina Phoenix

Independent Women's Football League
Sports in Greensboro, North Carolina
American football teams established in 2007
2007 establishments in North Carolina
Women's sports in North Carolina